Paristiopterus is a genus of armorheads native to the coasts of Australia and New Zealand, along with these recognized species:
 Paristiopterus gallipavo Whitley,  1944 (yellow-spotted boarfish)
 Paristiopterus labiosus (Günther, 1872) (giant boarfish)

References

Pentacerotidae